A cenotaph is a memorial monument, often used as a war memorial. The most famous example is arguably the Cenotaph in London. 

Cenotaph or the Cenotaph may also refer to:

Monuments and memorials 
Australia
 Sydney Cenotaph, Australia
Canada
 Cenotaph (Montreal), Canada
 Cenotaph (Regina, Saskatchewan), Canada
 National War Memorial (Canada), Ottawa
 Victory Square, Vancouver, Canada
Hong Kong
 The Cenotaph (Hong Kong)
 New Zealand
 Auckland Cenotaph
 Dunedin Cenotaph
 Wellington Cenotaph
Singapore
 The Cenotaph, Singapore
South Africa
 The Cenotaph, Cape Town, South Africa
United Kingdom
 The Cenotaph, Whitehall, London, England
 The Cenotaph, Southampton, England
 Manchester Cenotaph
United States
Cenotaph (San Antonio, Texas), in Alamo Plaza Historic District

Music
 Cenotaph (band), a Turkish death metal band
 Cenotaph (Bass Communion album) (2011) or its title track
 Cenotaph (EP), a 1989 EP by Bolt Thrower or its title track
 "Cenotaph" (song), a 1992 song by X Marks the Pedwalk
 20 Odd Years, Vol. 4: Cenotaph, a 2011 maxi single by Buck 65

Other uses 
 "Cenotaph", a two-part episode of Kung Fu